Myrmoglyphus is a genus of mites in the family Acaridae.

Species
 Myrmoglyphus bipilis Vitzthum, 1935

References

Acaridae